Campana is a town and comune in the province of Cosenza in the Calabria region of southern Italy.

In the municipal territory, within the Sila National Park are two megaliths (one known as "The Elephant of Campana"), dating from perhaps the 3rd century BC. The first, standing at c. 5,50 m, depicts either an Elephas antiquus, {{Citation needed}} or an elephant from the army of Pyrrhus or Hannibal; the second, missing the upper part, has a height of 7.50 m and was perhaps the lower part of a human statue.{{Citation needed}}

References

External links
 First Culture Web Page of Campana 

Cities and towns in Calabria